was a Japanese swimmer. He competed at the 1964 Summer Olympics and the 1968 Summer Olympics.

References

External links
 

1941 births
2015 deaths
Japanese male breaststroke swimmers
Olympic swimmers of Japan
Swimmers at the 1964 Summer Olympics
Swimmers at the 1968 Summer Olympics
Universiade medalists in swimming
People from Kagoshima Prefecture
Universiade gold medalists for Japan
Medalists at the 1965 Summer Universiade
Medalists at the 1967 Summer Universiade
20th-century Japanese people